Kevin Rodriguez may refer to:

 Kevin Rodriguez (soccer, born 1996), American soccer winger
 Kevin Rodríguez (footballer, born 2000), Ecuadorian football forward

See also
 Kevin Rodrigues-Pires (born 1991), Portuguese-German football midfielder
 Kévin Rodrigues (born 1994), Portuguese-French football defender